Powell Butte may refer to:

 Powell Butte, Boring Lava Field, Portland, Multnomah County, Oregon, USA; an extinct cindercone butte
 Powell Butte, Oregon, USA; an unincorporated community in Crook County
 Powell Buttes, Crook County, Oregon, USA; five rhyolitic butte mountains

See also

 
 Mount Powell (disambiguation)
 Powell (disambiguation)
 Butte (disambiguation)